The West Midtown Ferry Terminal is a passenger bus and ferry terminal serving ferries along the Hudson River in New York City and northeastern New Jersey. It is located at Pier 79 in Hudson River Park adjacent to the West Side Highway at West 39th Street in Midtown Manhattan. The facility first opened in 1986 with the start of NY Waterway commuter ferry service. 

Built largely with public funds, the West Midtown terminal is owned by the city and leased to NY Waterway, which operates ferries to Jersey City, Hoboken, Weehawken, and Edgewater in New Jersey. The ferry service refers to the terminal as Midtown / West 39th Street in scheduling. As a public terminal, the facility is open to any ferry company. NYC Ferry also uses the terminal for its St. George route, referring to it as West Midtown/W 39th St/Pier 79, while Seastreak uses it for service to the Raritan Bayshore.

The terminal is located on a narrow strip of land west of Hudson River Park and the West Side Highway, also known as Twelfth Avenue). Its construction required the incorporation of the ventilation towers of the Lincoln Tunnel built in the 1930s. Clad in glass, it contains six ferry slips as well as a passenger ticketing area and waiting room.

History

The Weehawken was the last ferry to the West Shore Railroad's Weehawken Terminal on March 25, 1959 at 1:10 am., ending a century of continuous service from 42nd Street. In 1981 Arthur Edward Imperatore, Sr., trucking magnate, purchased a  length of the Weehawken waterfront from the bankrupt Penn Central for $7.5 million and in 1986 established New York Waterway, with a route across the river that roughly paralleled the older one. Initially, the ferry slip at Pier 78 was a makeshift affair with limited, yet increasing ridership.

After the September 11, 2001 attacks on the World Trade Center destroyed the PATH terminal located there cross-Hudson passenger capacity was greatly reduced, and ferry service was expanded to compensate.  NY Waterway borrowed heavily to acquire new vessels to add new routes and add more runs to schedules. City and state agencies contracted the construction of new ferry terminals to be leased to private operators, of which the West Midtown is one. With the restoration of rapid transit service, ridership numbers dropped significantly. The Port Authority of New York and New Jersey brokered a deal to avoid bankruptcy and disruption of service.

In 2005, the facility was overhauled to accommodate an increasing demand for ferry service in the Port of New York and New Jersey and to provide ferry slips for short haul crossings, water taxis, and high-speed long-distance service. The 2005 renovation was built by the New York City Economic Development Corporation.

Services

Ferry

NY Waterway commuter ferries connect to several New Jersey terminals, reaching , Weehawken Port Imperial, and Hoboken 14th Street 7 days a week. Hoboken Terminal and Paulus Hook Ferry Terminal, and Edgewater Landing are also served weekday peak hours.

Service on the St. George route of the NYC Ferry system began in August 2021. Ferries make an intermediate stop at Brookfield Place Terminal in Battery Park City before terminating at a dock nearby the St. George Terminal and Empire Outlets on Staten Island.

Bus
NY Waterway maintains a fleet of buses which provide free connecting service to the ferry that run on peak and off peak routes in Manhattan below 59th Street. New York City transit buses M42 and M50 stop in the vicinity of the terminal at 42nd Street.

Slips 
The terminal has seven slips, of which five are usually used:
Slip 1: Unused
Slip 2: NYC Ferry
Slip 3: NY Waterway Edgewater and IKEA Shuttle, Seastreak
Slip 4: NY Waterway Paulus Hook/Hoboken South, Seastreak
Slip 5: NY Waterway Lincoln Harbor/Hoboken North
Slip 6: NY Waterway Port Imperial
Slip 7: Unused

See also
NY Waterway
Battery Park City Ferry Terminal
Pier 11/Wall Street

References

Port of New York and New Jersey
Ferry transportation in New York City
Transit hubs serving New Jersey
Hell's Kitchen, Manhattan
Ferry terminals in Manhattan
West Side Highway